Valerie Wiener (born October 30, 1948) was a Democratic member of the Nevada Senate, representing Clark County District 3 (map) from 1996 through 2012.

External links
Nevada State Legislature - Senator Valerie Wiener official government website
Project Vote Smart - Senator Valerie Wiener (NV) profile
Follow the Money - Valerie Wiener
2004 2000 1996 campaign contributions

Democratic Party members of the Nevada Assembly
Democratic Party Nevada state senators
1948 births
Living people
Women state legislators in Nevada
20th-century American politicians
20th-century American women politicians
21st-century American politicians
21st-century American women politicians
Politicians from Las Vegas